The IEEE Edison Medal is presented by the Institute of Electrical and Electronics Engineers (IEEE) "for a career of meritorious achievement in electrical science, electrical engineering, or the electrical arts." It is the oldest medal in this field of engineering.   The award consists of a gold medal, bronze replica, small gold replica, certificate, and honorarium.  The medal may only be awarded to a new leap/breakthrough in the technological area of science.

Background 
The Edison Medal, named after the inventor and entrepreneur Thomas Edison, was created on 11 February 1904 by a group of Edison's friends and associates. Four years later the American Institute of Electrical Engineers (AIEE) entered into an agreement with the group to present the medal as its highest award. The first medal was presented in 1909 to Elihu Thomson. Other recipients of the Edison Medal include George Westinghouse, Alexander Graham Bell, Nikola Tesla, Michael I. Pupin, Robert A. Millikan (Nobel Prize 1923), and Vannevar Bush. A complete and authoritative list is published by the IEEE online.

After the merger of AIEE and the Institute of Radio Engineers (IRE), in 1963, to form the IEEE, it was decided that IRE's Medal of Honor would be presented as IEEE's highest award, while the Edison Medal would become IEEE's principal medal.

Twelve persons with an exceptional career in electrical engineering received both the IEEE Edison Medal and the IEEE Medal of Honor, namely Edwin Howard Armstrong, Ernst Alexanderson, Mihajlo Pupin, Arthur E. Kennelly, Vladimir K. Zworykin, John R. Pierce, Sidney Darlington, James L. Flanagan, Nick Holonyak, Robert H. Dennard, Dave Forney, and Kees Schouhamer Immink.

Recipients 
Source
 
 1909: Elihu Thomson
 1910: Frank J. Sprague
 1911: George Westinghouse
 1912: William Stanley, Jr.
 1913: Charles F. Brush
 1914: Alexander Graham Bell
 1915: No Award
 1916: Nikola Tesla
 1917: John J. Carty
 1918: Benjamin G. Lamme
 1919: William Le Roy Emmet
 1920: Mihajlo I. Pupin
 1921: Cummings C. Chesney
 1922: Robert A. Millikan
 1923: John W. Lieb
 1924: John White Howell
 1925: Harris J. Ryan
 1926: No Award
 1927: William D. Coolidge
 1928: Frank B. Jewett
 1929: Charles F. Scott
 1930: Frank Conrad
 1931: Edwin W. Rice
 1932: Bancroft Gherardi, Jr.
 1933: Arthur E. Kennelly
 1934: Willis R. Whitney
 1935: Lewis B. Stillwell
 1936: Alex Dow
 1937: Gano Dunn
 1938: Dugald C. Jackson
 1939: Philip Torchio
 1940: George Ashley Campbell
 1941: John B. Whitehead
 1942: Edwin H. Armstrong
 1943: Vannevar Bush
 1944: Ernst Alexanderson
 1945: Philip Sporn
 1946: Lee De Forest
 1947: Joseph Slepian
 1948: Morris E. Leeds
 1949: Karl B. McEachron
 1950: Otto B. Blackwell
 1951: Charles F. Wagner
 1952: Vladimir K. Zworykin
 1953: John F. Peters
 1954: Oliver E. Buckley
 1955: Leonid A. Umansky
 1956: Comfort A. Adams
 1957: John K. Hodnette
 1958: Charles F. Kettering
 1959: James F. Fairman
 1960: Harold S. Osborne
 1961: William B. Kouwenhoven
 1962: Alexander C. Monteith
 1963: John R. Pierce
 1964: No Award
 1965: Walker Lee Cisler
 1966: Wilmer L. Barrow
 1967: George Harold Brown
 1968: Charles F. Avila
 1969: Hendrik Wade Bode
 1970: Howard H. Aiken
 1971: John Wistar Simpson
 1972: William Hayward Pickering
 1973: Bernard D. H. Tellegen
 1974: Jan A. Rajchman
 1975: Sidney Darlington
 1976: Murray Joslin
 1977: Henri G. Busignies
 1978: Daniel E. Noble
 1979: Albert Rose
 1980: Robert Adler
 1981: C. Chapin Cutler
 1982: Nathan Cohn
 1983: Herman P. Schwan
 1984: Eugene I. Gordon
 1985: John D. Kraus
 1986: James L. Flanagan
 1987: Robert A. Henle
 1988: James Ross MacDonald
 1989: Nick Holonyak, Jr.
 1990: Archie W. Straiton
 1991: John L. Moll
 1992: George D. Forney
 1993: James H. Pomerene
 1994: Leslie A. Geddes
 1995: Robert W. Lucky
 1996: Floyd Dunn
 1997: Esther M. Conwell
 1998: Rolf Landauer
 1999: Kees Schouhamer Immink
 2000: Jun-ichi Nishizawa
 2001: Robert H. Dennard
 2002: Edward E. Hammer
 2003: No Award
 2004: Federico Capasso
 2005: Peter Lawrenson
 2006: Fawwaz T. Ulaby
 2007: Russel D. Dupuis
 2008: Dov Frohman-Bentchkowsky
 2009: Tingye Li
 2010: Ray Dolby
 2011: Isamu Akasaki
 2012: Michael Francis Tompsett
 2013: 
 2014: Ralph Baer
 2015: James Spilker
 2016: Robert W. Brodersen
 2017: M. George Craford
 2018: Eli Yablonovitch
 2019: Ursula Keller
 2020: Frede Blaabjerg
 2021: 
 2022: Alan Bovik
 2023:

See also
List of engineering awards
List of physics awards
List of prizes named after people

References

External links 
 IEEE Edison Medal page at IEEE
 Complete List of Edison Medal Recipients
 IEEE Edison Medal Nomination Form
 New York Times on the Edison Medal
 IEEE Edison Medal page at IEEE Global History Network

Edison Medal
Thomas Edison
 
Academic awards
Awards established in 1904
1904 establishments in the United States